Henry Colin Gray Matthew (15 January 1941 – 29 October 1999) was a British historian and academic. He was an editor of the Oxford Dictionary of National Biography and editor of the diaries of William Ewart Gladstone.

Early life

Matthew was born in Inverness on 15 January 1941. He was educated at Edinburgh Academy and later at the English public school, Sedbergh. He proceeded to Christ Church in the University of Oxford in 1960 to read modern history. He graduated Bachelor of Arts (BA) in 1963.

Academic career

In 1963, Matthew moved to work as a teacher in what is now Tanzania in East Africa, where he met his American wife Sue Ann Curry (born 1941). They moved to Oxford in 1966, where they married.  Matthew began first an uncompleted diploma in politics and economics, and then a doctorate on the imperial wing of the Liberal Party in the 1890s and 1900s, completed in 1970.

In 1970, Matthew was appointed lecturer in Gladstone studies at Christ Church, a post tied to the assistant editorship of the Gladstone Diaries, then being prepared for publication by M. R. D. Foot. In 1972 Matthew succeeded Foot as the sole editor, and completed the project. In 1978 Matthew was elected fellow and tutor in modern history at St Hugh's College, Oxford.

When Oxford University Press proposed a revision of the Dictionary of National Biography in the early 1990s, Matthew's work on the Gladstone Diaries recommended him for the position. He began work in 1992 and devised the editorial structure and guidelines for the dictionary, as well as writing or revising several hundred articles for the work.

Matthew died from a heart attack in Oxford on 29 October 1999.  The dictionary was published in 2004 following Matthew's plan.

References

Sources

Oxford Dictionary of National Biography (includes photo)

1941 births
1999 deaths
20th-century Scottish historians
People educated at Sedbergh School
Alumni of Christ Church, Oxford
Dictionary of National Biography
People from Inverness